Daniel Thomas Plesac (born February 4, 1962) is a former Major League Baseball pitcher with an 18-year career from 1986 to 2003. He played for the Milwaukee Brewers, Toronto Blue Jays, Chicago Cubs, Pittsburgh Pirates, Arizona Diamondbacks, and Philadelphia Phillies.

Early life
Plesac attended Crown Point High School in Crown Point, Indiana, where he excelled in baseball, basketball, football, and track.

Plesac played college baseball for the NC State Wolfpack in the early 1980s.  Plesac was inducted to the North Carolina State Baseball Hall of Fame in 2010.

Major Leagues
A hard thrower with a mid-90 mph fastball and great slider, Plesac was originally a starting pitcher before becoming the closer of the Milwaukee Brewers. Plesac served primarily as a left-handed specialist from the mid-1990s until the end of his career, pitching for the Blue Jays twice, the Diamondbacks, and the Phillies.

He was elected to the American League All-Star team three times (1987, 1988 and 1989) and ended his career with a 65–71 record, a 3.64 ERA in 1,064 games and 1,072 innings pitched. In 1988, Plesac recorded three saves against the Twins in a weekend series immediately preceding the 1988 All Star Game in Cincinnati. Due to travel complications, he flew to Cincinnati on the Reds team chartered plane.

Plesac holds numerous all-time Brewers pitching records (minimum 500 innings pitched). He is the franchise's career leader in games, saves and ERA. He is second in K/9 and WHIP (BB + H/IP), in both cases to Ben Sheets, and is fifth in K/BB ratio.

He was the last Phillies pitcher to pitch at Veterans Stadium. He struck out the only batter he faced, Ryan Langerhans, to record the third out in the top of the ninth inning on September 28, 2003, as the Phillies lost to the Atlanta Braves, 5–2.

In his 18 year career, Plesac was never on the disabled list, never having surgery in or off season.

Television career
Plesac worked as a news telecaster for Comcast Sportsnet Chicago, co-hosting as a highlighter for Chicago Cubs and pre and post game shows from 2005 until the end of the 2008 season. Plesac joined the MLB Network and became an analyst January 2009. He appears on MLB Tonight and is an occasional guest host for Intentional Talk. He also served as a broadcaster for the MLB: The Show video game franchise. Plesac served as color commentator for the world feed of the 2021 World Series and 2022 All-Star Game produced by MLB International, airing in over 200 countries as well as on the American Forces Network. During the 2021 World Series, he worked alongside Scott Braun, who provided play-by-play, while for the 2022 All Star Game, he worked with Jason Benetti.

Personal life

An avid horse racing fan, Plesac became a horse trainer after retirement and once saved an old horse he previously owned after learning it was left in poor condition. His nephew is Zach Plesac.

References

External links

1962 births
Living people
American expatriate baseball players in Canada
American League All-Stars
Arizona Diamondbacks players
Baseball players from Gary, Indiana
Chicago Cubs announcers
Chicago Cubs players
El Paso Diablos players
Major League Baseball broadcasters
Major League Baseball pitchers
Milwaukee Brewers players
MLB Network personalities
NC State Wolfpack baseball players
Paintsville Brewers players
Philadelphia Phillies players
Pittsburgh Pirates players
Stockton Ports players
Toronto Blue Jays players
Alaska Goldpanners of Fairbanks players